Naz Edwards (born Nazig Dombalagian (Western Armenian: Նազիգ Դոմբալագեան) on February 2, 1952) is an American voice actress, singer, and Broadway star who is most remembered as the voice of antagonist Queen Beryl in the DiC English version of Sailor Moon. She is of Armenian descent.

In 1994, she starred in the TV movie And Then There Was One.

In 2012 and 2014, Edwards was a regional judge for the Songbook Academy, a summer intensive for high school students operated by the Great American Songbook Foundation and founded by Michael Feinstein.

Filmography

Film

Television

References

External links
 

1952 births
Living people
Ethnic Armenian actresses
American people of Armenian descent
American voice actresses
American stage actresses
Actresses from Philadelphia
Musicians from Philadelphia
21st-century American women